Subcancilla scrobiculata is an extinct species of sea snail, a marine gastropod mollusk in the family Mitridae, the miters or miter snails.

 Subspecies  Cancilla scrobiculata crosnieri Cernohorsky, 1970 (temporary name) (distribution: in the Atlantic Ocean off the mouth of the Congo river) (synonym: Cancilla scrobiculata crosnieri Cernohorsky, 1970)

Description

Distribution

References

 Cernohorsky W.O., (1970). New Mitridae and Volutomitridae. The Nautilus 83(3): 95-104
 Cernohorsky W.O. (1991). The Mitridae of the world. Part 2. The subfamily Mitrinae concluded and subfamilies Imbricariinae and Cylindromitrinae. Monographs of Marine Mollusca. 4: ii + 164 pp.

External links
 Brocchi, G. B. (1814). Conchiologia fossile subapennina con osservazioni geologiche sugli Apennini e sul suolo adiacente. Milano. Vol. 1: i-lxxx, 1-56, 1-240; vol. 2: 241-712, 16 pls

Mitridae
Gastropods described in 1814